The Battle of Jericho by Sharon M. Draper is a young adult novel. It's the first book in the Jericho Trilogy. The book is set in high school and deals with the issues of peer pressure, acceptance, discrimination, sexual tension, and social interaction.

Plot summary 
The story takes place at Frederick Douglass High School. Junior Jericho Prescott and his cousin Josh, along with their friends Dana Wolfe and Kofi Freeman, decide to pledge for one of the most popular and prestigious organizations at school, the Warriors of Distinction. While the "Warriors" seem to be an upstanding organization that does a lot for the community, their governing is far more corrupt and plagued. Eddie Mahoney, the pledge master, sends the group through unnecessarily cruel tricks and task to humiliate and degrade them as they pledge for membership. From eating worms to being paddled, Dana receives the most harassment which crosses the line of sexual harassment. While they have the opportunity to quit, Josh and Jericho choose popularity and peer acceptance and it ends in a hazing accident gone wrong which cost Josh's life.

Characters 
 Jericho Prescott: Main character
 Josh Prescott: Jericho's cousin
 Kofi Freeman: Jericho's friend and Dana's boyfriend
 Arielle Gresham: Jericho's girlfriend
 Dana Wolfe: Kofi's girlfriend and Arielle and November's friend
 November Nelson: Josh's girlfriend and Arielle and Dana's friend
 Eddie Mahoney: Pledge master and main antagonist
 Eric Bell: Jericho's classmate
 Mr. Zucker: Jericho's dad / cop
 Mr. Tambori: Jericho's music teacher
 Brock Prescott: Josh's father
 Cedric Prescott: Jericho's father
 Geneva: Jericho's stepmother
 Mr. Boston: Jericho's teacher
 Mr. Culligan: leader for the Warriors of Distinction

Awards 
This book has been critically acclaimed for tackling the issues of hazing, peer-pressure, sexual tension, and other social teen issues. 
 2004 Coretta Scott King Honor Book
 New York Public Library's Book for the Teen Age
 2005 Young Adult Choice Books—International Reading Association

References

2003 American novels
American young adult novels
African-American young adult novels
Novels set in high schools and secondary schools
Atheneum Books books
Novels by Sharon Draper